Hypericum adpressum, common name creeping St. Johnswort, is a flowering perennial plant found growing on wet ground in the United States.

References

Flora of the United States
adpressum